"It's So Hard to Say Goodbye to Yesterday" is an R&B song written by Motown husband-and-wife songwriting team Freddie Perren and Christine Yarian for the 1975 film Cooley High. In the film, the song is performed by Motown artist G.C. Cameron, whose rendition peaked at number 38 on the Billboard R&B singles chart that same year. Perren also composed the instrumental score for Cooley High, and the B-side to "It's So Hard to Say Goodbye to Yesterday" features two of his score compositions from the film.

Boyz II Men cover

The composition was recorded in an a cappella rendition by contemporary R&B Motown group Boyz II Men 16 years later. Released as a single, Boyz II Men's recording of "It's So Hard to Say Goodbye to Yesterday" peaked at number two on the Billboard Hot 100 and reached number one on the Hot R&B Singles chart in December 1991. The track was included on Boyz II Men's first album, Cooleyhighharmony, its name a reference to the film from which the song originated.

The music video for the song featured archive footage of Jim Henson, Sammy Davis Jr. and Gilda Radner, who'd all passed away one to two years before.

The song was used in the 1992 action film Lethal Weapon 3, in the funeral scene for Daryl, a 15-year-old gangbanger shot down by Murtaugh.

Track listings
US cassette single
A 		It's So Hard To Say Goodbye To Yesterday (LP Version) 		
  	Album Snippets
B1 		Under Pressure 		
B2 		Please Don't Go 		
B3 		Lonely Heart 		
B4 		Uhh Ahh 		
B5 		It's So Hard To Say Goodbye To Yesterday

Europe Maxi-CD
 It's Hard To Say Goodbye To Yesterday (Radio Version) 	3:06 	
 It's Hard To Say Goodbye To Yesterday (A capella Version) 	3:49 	
 Album Snippets
3a 		Under Pressure 	0:48 	
3b 		Please Don't Go 	1:00 	
3c 		Lonely Heart 	1:00 	
3d 		Uhh Ahh 	1:03

Other versions
The Flex covered "It's So Hard to Say Goodbye to Yesterday" for the House Party 2 soundtrack album, released in October 1991.

A Cantonese version of "It's So Hard to Say Goodbye to Yesterday" was covered by Jacky Cheung.  The song is titled "偷閒加油站" and it is featured on the 1992 album 真情流露.

Charts and certifications

G.C. Cameron version

Boyz II Men version

Weekly charts

Year-end charts

Certifications

See also
 R&B number-one hits of 1991 (USA)

References

1975 singles
1991 singles
Motown singles
A cappella songs
Boyz II Men songs
Cashbox number-one singles
Songs written by Freddie Perren
Songs written for films
Song recordings produced by Freddie Perren
1975 songs
Songs about nostalgia
Songs about parting
Cultural depictions of Sammy Davis Jr.